Southeast Region or South-East Region may refer to:

Southeast Region, Brazil, region composed by the states of Espírito Santo, Minas Gerais, Rio de Janeiro and São Paulo
South-East Region, Ireland region composed by counties Carlow, Kilkenny, South Tipperary, Wexford, and Waterford
South-East Region, Singapore, alternate name for the East Region of Singapore
Little League World Series (Southeast Region), United States region for the Little League World Series

See also
Points of the compass